Manoj Majee is an Indian plant molecular biologist, biochemist, inventor and a senior scientist at the National Institute of Plant Genome Research (NIPGR), New Delhi. He is known for his studies on the molecular and biochemical basis of seed vigor, longevity and seedling establishment.

Majee graduated in Botany with honors from Burdwan University in 1995 and obtained an MSc from Visva-Bharati University in 1998. His doctoral research was at Bose Institute on plant biochemistry and molecular biology which earned him a PhD from Jadavpur University in 2005 after which he did his post—doctoral work at the University of Kentucky. On his return to India, he joined the National Institute of Plant Genome Research as a staff scientist where he holds the position of a Scientist Grade V.

Majee holds two patents, and has published a number of articles, ResearchGate, an online repository of scientific articles has listed 49 of them. The Department of Biotechnology of the Government of India awarded him the National Bioscience Award for Career Development, one of the highest Indian science awards, for his contributions to biosciences, in 2017/18. He is also a recipient of the Young Scientist Medal of the Indian National Science Academy and the Young Scientist Platinum Jubilee Award of the National Academy of Sciences, India, both in 2011.

Selected bibliography

Patents

See also 

 Plant stress measurement
 Polynucleotide

Notes

References

External links 
 

Indian scientific authors
Year of birth missing (living people)
N-BIOS Prize recipients
People from West Bengal
Indian molecular biologists
Indian biochemists
University of Burdwan alumni
Visva-Bharati University alumni
Jadavpur University alumni
University of Kentucky alumni
Scientists from West Bengal
Living people